Charles Hurst may refer to:

 Charles Angas Hurst (1923–2011), Australian mathematical physicist 
 Charles Chamberlain Hurst (1870–1947), English geneticist